Santa Who? is a 2000 American made-for-television fantasy-comedy film starring Leslie Nielsen and directed by William Dear, in which Santa Claus develops a case of amnesia right before Christmas.

Plot

The film starts with Santa feeling ill and going out for fresh air on a flight in his sleigh. Because of bad weather, he falls out and lands in Los Angeles. After the fall, he is unable to remember who he is. An afraid-of-commitment TV news reporter finds him and uses him on TV to get audience while asking them to find his family. In the meantime, Santa works in a mall.

The TV news reporter's girlfriend's son repeatedly tries to convince the adults that he is the real Santa Claus, which the adults refuse to believe.

Santa still remembers certain details about Christmas but is unable to remember how he knows them, as typically happens with source amnesia. All the while, Santa's elves are looking for him. Near the end, a couple thinks it could be their grandfather who has grown a beard, and take him with them. Instead, when it is proved he is Santa, the reporter regains his faith in Christmas and gains a family.

Cast

Reception
Christopher Null of Filmcritic.com gave Santa Who? 2 out of 5 stars. Perry Seibert of AllMovie gave the film 3 stars out of 5.

Laura Fries of Variety wrote "Santa Who?, an original Wonderful World of Disney film, does its best to imitate the great holiday classics, but in the end it's about as rewarding as a lump of coal in your stocking". Aliya Whiteley of Den of Geek called Santa Who? "a classic".

Announced remake 
In July 2021, Lionsgate, which holds rights to this film as the owner of the Hearst Entertainment library, told Deadline that it planned to remake it, alongside The Babysitter's Seduction, Sex, Lies, & Obsession, Blue Valley Songbird, Sex & Mrs. X, A Different Kind of Christmas, and other Hearst titles with MarVista Entertainment, which will work with Lionsgate in distributing these films. Neither studio released details about these remakes, which they plan to release to an undetermined streaming service.

See also
List of television films produced for American Broadcasting Company
 List of Christmas films
 Santa Claus in film

References

External links

2000 films
American Christmas films
2000s fantasy comedy films
Films directed by William Dear
Santa Claus in film
Santa Claus in television
American television films
Christmas television films
Films scored by Joel McNeely
2000s Christmas films
American Christmas comedy films
2000 comedy films
2000s American films